Acalymma trivittatum, the western striped cucumber beetle, is a species of leaf beetle in the family Chrysomelidae. It is found in Central America and North America. It is considered a key pest on crops in the Cucurbitaceae family.

References

Further reading

 
 

Galerucinae
Articles created by Qbugbot
Beetles described in 1843
Taxa named by Carl Gustaf Mannerheim (naturalist)
Agricultural pest insects